André Antranik Manoukian (born 9 April 1957 in Lyon) is a French songwriter, arranger, jazz musician, and actor of Armenian descent.
Between 2002-2017, he served as one of four judges in the French version of Pop Idol, Nouvelle Star.

Early years and education
Born in Lyon, France, Manoukian is of Armenian descent. He began playing the piano when he was seven years old. Later, when he was a student, he sold organs in a shop to earn money. At 20, he studied music at the Berklee College of Music in Boston. After the basics he studied musical composition, arrangement and harmony.

Music career
Upon returning to France Manoukian started a jazz band called Horn Stuff. At the same time he composed for female singers and two jazz-funk albums were recorded. He was also approached to join the band of the singer Michèle Torr.

In 1983 he met the singer Liane Foly and in addition to becoming her partner, he composed her first successes, including Au fur et à mesure and Doucement. He also wrote for such artists as Michel Petrucciani, Richard Galliano, Charles Aznavour, Freddy Zucchet, Gilbert Bécaud, Diane Dufresne, Nicole Croisille, Natacha Atlas, Viktor Lazlo, Janet Jackson, Myriam Abel, Camille Bazbaz et Malia. He completed the musical arrangement and composition for films including Quatre étoiles et Jean-Philippe. 
 
He is currently well known by the general public for being on the M6 reality TV series, Nouvelle Star (New Star). He has been on the jury since the first season along with Marianne James, Manu Katché and Dove Attia. During transmission he is the "poet" and philosopher juror. He is a member of the jury of Nouvelle Star series 6, besides singers Sinclair and Lio and the music journalist Philippe Manoeuvre.

In 2004 he did dubbing in the DVD bonus of Shrek II, where he dubbed one of the jurors of the singing competition.

He was also in the transmission of T'empêches tout le monde de dormir (You stop everyone sleeping) on M6 presented by Marc-Olivier Fogiel where he portrayed in his manner the  "Psycho-erotico-cosmico-musical" of the guests by translating the name of a personality in shorthand notes with a melody which he composed and played on the synthesizer.

On 5 February 2007, Manoukian presented the Globes de Cristal besides Elisabeth Quin on Paris Première. Since 21 February 2007 he has presented Dédé les doigts de fée (Dede nimble fingers) on Paris Première, a program about guests who have different music backgrounds. For him, their life is a song recorded on a multi-track. To better portray his guests, Manoukian invites them to recount their lives in a real recording studio and he then composes a novel piece of music based on their stories. In the same year Manoukian composed the new Album (music) for Beverly, a contestant in Nouvelle Star 4 and he also accompanied Miss Dominique at the piano during some of her concerts.

Book release
His first book La Mécanique des Fluides (Fluid Mechanics) was released in February 2008. The book is an autobiography in the form of a monologue mainly tracing his artistic career as a pianist and a composer as well as his artistic and emotional life.

Discography

Albums
Inkala (2008)
So in Love (2010)
Melanchology (2011)
Apatride (2017)
Les pianos de Gainsbourg (2021)

Composer and producer
The Man I Love – Liane Foly (1988)
Rêve Orange – Liane Foly (1990)
My Delicious Poisons – Viktor Lazlo (1991)
Les petites notes – Liane Foly (1993)
Sweet Mystery (English version of petites notes) – Liane Foly (1994)
Yellow Daffodils – Malia (2002)
La Chanteuse de bal – Liane Foly (2004)
Echoes of Dreams – Malia (2004)
Young Bones – Malia (2007)
Cheyenne Song – Gaetane Abrial (2008)

Producer
Lumières – Liane Foly (1994)
Jazzaznavour – Charles Aznavour (1998)
Faut faire avec – Gilbert Bécaud (1999)
La Vie devant toi – Myriam Abel (2006)
  
André Manoukian has also produced albums for Michel Petrucciani and Richard Galliano.

Composer
Translation of "Again" from Janet Jackson (1994)
Épine de rose (lyrics: P. Grosz) – Diane Dufresne (2000)
Ne dis rien – Julie Demne (2002)
À quoi ça sert (lyrics: C. Bazbaz) – Gérard Darmon (2003)
Éternelle – Nicole Croisille (2004)
Haut les coeurs (lyrics: F. Deweare) – Natasha St-Pier (2009)

Movies
Manoukian made the music of several films.

Les ténors, directed by Francis De Gueltz (1993)
Four Stars, directed by Christian Vincent (2006)
Jean-Philippe, directed by Laurent Tuel (2006)
La grande boucle, directed by Laurent Tuel (2013)
Fonzy, directed by Isabelle Doval (2013)
Les yeux ouverts, TV Movie directed by Lorraine Lévy (2015)

Filmography

Others 
He was one of the contestant during the First season of Danse avec les stars.  He also joined singer Christophe Willem as a commentator for France 4 during the semifinals of the Eurovision Song Contest 2018 in Lisbon, Portugal.

Dancing with the Stars
He was one of the contestants during the First season of Danse avec les stars. With his partner Candice Pascal, he finished in the 8th position (last).
This table shows the route of André Manoukian and Candice Pascal in Danse Avec Les Stars.

References

*

Specific

External links

Official website
Interview – Radio France Internationale 

Living people
1957 births
Musicians from Lyon
French people of Armenian descent
French songwriters
Male songwriters
French jazz pianists
21st-century French male pianists
French male jazz musicians